Sports 360 was a sports-oriented show developed by Sports5 and it is aired on TV5. It was previously known as a pre-game program for the PBA games from November 2014 until it became a spin-off since February 1, 2015. The show focused on the latest news in the PBA, United Football League, Pacific Xtreme Combat, and other sports, as well as sport interviews.

The show previously aired on Sunday afternoons before the PBA before moving to a late night timeslot to accommodate airing other sporting events on TV5.

Hosts

Final
 Aaron Atayde 
 Erika Padilla

Previous
 Nikko Ramos (2015)
 Mela Tunay (2015–2016) 
 Ramon Bautista (2015–2016) 
 Jojo The Love Survivor (2015–2016)

Controversy

'Kangkong' joke issue
On the May 17, 2015 episode, Atayde waved a 'kangkong' (water spinach) in front of former Barangay Ginebra San Miguel player Dylan Ababou, amid on questioning his return. The said joke caused a lot of Ginebra 'diehard' fans much to dismay. In June 2015, Atayde was suspended indefinitely by Sports5 management from all PBA-related shows.

See also
PBA on Sports5

References

TV5 (Philippine TV network) original programming
2015 Philippine television series debuts
2016 Philippine television series endings
Filipino-language television shows